Senator Crossley may refer to:

Randolph Crossley (1904–2004), Hawaii State Senate
Wallace Crossley (1874–1943), Missouri State Senate